Miroslav Milošević (Serbian Cyrillic: Mиpocлaв Mилoшeвић; born 29 August 1976 in Niš) is a former Serbian footballer who played as a defender.

Honours
Cherno More
 Bulgarian Cup: runner-up 2006

External sources
 Profile at Ogol.

1976 births
Living people
Serbian footballers
Serbian expatriate footballers
FK Radnički Niš players
PFC Cherno More Varna players
Alki Larnaca FC players
PFC Dobrudzha Dobrich players
FK Pelister players
Association football defenders
Expatriate footballers in Bulgaria
Expatriate footballers in Cyprus
Serbian expatriate sportspeople in Bulgaria
First Professional Football League (Bulgaria) players
Cypriot First Division players
Sportspeople from Niš